Jens Christian Madsen (born 1 February 1970), also known as is a Danish former footballer. He competed in the men's tournament at the 1992 Summer Olympics.

Career
Madsen started his career with Køge Boldklub but soon moved to Brøndby IF, where he went on to make 186 appearances for the club in which he scored 21 goals between 1988 and 1994. He also won three Danish championships at the club as well as two Danish Cups. Madsen moved to AaB in 1994, where he won another championship in his first year. Later, he moved to Herfølge Boldklub, where he won his fifth championship in 2000 with his third club as an active player.

After a hugely successful playing career in Denmark, he moved abroad for the first time in 2000, signing with Greek Super League club Skoda Xanthi. He left after five months, describing his tenure there as "a personal crisis", and added in an interview with Tipsbladet: "The club had no idea who I was. I might as well have been a handball player". Madsen later signed with Scottish club Livingston, but said that he had suffered personally from his experience in Greece, which meant that he lacked motivation.

Madsen retired from football after one season in Herfølge Boldklub in 2002.

Honours
Brøndby
1st Division(): 1988, 1990, 1991
Danish Cup: 1988–89, 1993–94

AaB
Danish Superliga(): 1994–95

Herfølge
Danish Superliga(): 1999–2000

References

External links
 

1970 births
Living people
Danish men's footballers
Brøndby IF players
AaB Fodbold players
Herfølge Boldklub players
Xanthi F.C. players
Livingston F.C. players
Danish Superliga players
Super League Greece players
Denmark international footballers
Olympic footballers of Denmark
Footballers at the 1992 Summer Olympics
Footballers from Copenhagen
Association football midfielders
Danish expatriate sportspeople in Greece
Danish expatriate sportspeople in Scotland
Expatriate footballers in Scotland
Expatriate footballers in Greece
Danish expatriate men's footballers